"Bahama" is an Icelandic 2008 summer hit song from the band Ingó og Veðurguðirnir showcasing Ingó Veðurguð on main vocals. The song also appears as track #2 on Ingó og Veðurguðirnir's 2009 album Góðar stundir.

The song stayed at the top of the Icelandic Singles Chart for 8 consecutive weeks during the summer of 2008.

References

2008 singles
Icelandic songs
Icelandic-language songs
2008 songs
Song articles with missing songwriters